Dyschirius rufimanus is a species of ground beetle in the subfamily Scaritinae. It was described by A. Fleischer in 1898.

References

rufimanus
Beetles described in 1898